Margherita Gonzaga (2 October 1591 – 7 February 1632) was Duchess of Lorraine from 1606 until 1624 by marriage to Henry II, Duke of Lorraine. She was an agent of Pro-French and anti Protestant policy in Lorraine, and are most known for her support of her daughter Nicole's right to the Duchy of Lorraine. She also claimed her right to Monferrato during the Mantuan war of succession.

Life
She was born in Mantua, the eldest daughter of Vincenzo I Gonzaga and Eleonora de' Medici; she was also a sister of Francesco IV Gonzaga, Ferdinando I Gonzaga, Vincenzo II Gonzaga and Eleonora Gonzaga. Her brothers all succeeded their father as Duke of Mantua and Eleonora became Holy Roman Empress by her marriage to Ferdinand II, Holy Roman Emperor.

Marriage
She married Henry II, Duke of Lorraine on 24 April 1606. He had previously been married to Catherine of Navarre, sister of King Henry IV of France, but the marriage was childless (Catherine was forty years old at the time of her marriage).

A marriage between Henry II and Margherita Gonzaga, her being the niece of the new Queen of France (Marie de Medici), would ally the Lorraine not only with the House of Gonzaga but also work as a proxy alliance between Lorraine and France, and that is how it was perceived at the French royal court as well. In September 1605, Henry IV of France and Vincenzo I Gonzaga agreed to make a mutual alliance with Lorraine through Margherita, and in February 1606 the marriage contract was signed in Paris by the agents of the bride and groom. A wedding by proxy took place in Mantova in April 1606, followed by the wedding in Nancy in June.

Duchess of Lorraine
In May 1608 Henry II succeeded his father as Duke of Lorraine and Margherita Gonzaga became Duchess. She was described as unattractive with a heavy chin and a big nose and was said to look older than her years, but also as strong and healthy. She was a spendthrift who loved luxury and reportedly loved to give expensive gifts, bought twelve shoes every months and continued to expand her stable with new horses; she was an enthusiastic hostess who preferred to stay in the Ducal Palace of Nancy, were she often arranged balls.

Margherita Gonzaga did have some political influence. Described as a Catholic fanatic, she supported Henry's persecution of the huguenots in Lorraine, and supported his decree in which all Protestants were ordered to leave Lorrain before 20 April 1617. She supported a Pro-French policy and successfully prevented the marriage of her daughter to a Spanish prince and instead supported (this time unsuccessful) her marriage to the French Dauphin.

In the absence of a son, Margherita and Henry attempted to secure the inheritance of Lorraine and Bar for their eldest daughter Nicole. They arranged a marriage between Nicole and Louis de Guise, son of cardinal Louis II of Lorraine. However, Henry II's younger brother Francois de Guise, comte de Vaudemont, refused Nicole's right by claiming that the Salic law applied in Lorraine, a conflict which was not settled until Nicole was married to Francois de Guise's son Charles.

Later life
On 13 July 1624 Henry died and was succeeded by his daughter Nicole with the support of Margherita Gonzaga. In 1625, Nicole's rights were challenged by her father-in-law Francois de Guise and her husband.  Margherita Gonzaga travelled to the French royal court in Paris and successfully asked Louis XIII of France to send a French army to support her daughters right and duchess regnant of Lorraine. When Louis XIII sent an army under Louis de Marillac to the Duchy, however, Francois de Guise managed to win over the support of the Lorraine Estates, who were afraid of France, and be declared Francis II of Lorraine, deposing Nicole; he soon abdicated in favor of his son, who became Charles IV of Lorraine. After this event, France retracted their military support to Margherita Gonzaga and Nicole; Margherita Gonzaga made repeated attempts to secure French support for her daughter, but France was unwilling to engage further, although it did give Margherita support in words.

I December 1627 Margherita's brother died, and a war broke out over the Mantuan succession. Margherita Gonzaga pressed her own right to Monferrato, which in contrast to Mantua had female succession; a theory is that she wanted to give her daughter Nicole a realm from her mother, since she had been deprived of her fathers realm. However, Margherita was not able to secure any support for her claim, particularly since her closest ally France supported Charles of Nevers. In the Regensburg Treaty of October 1630 she was given the right to compensation for having given of her claims (against her will).

In 1631, Margherita Gonzaga defended her daughter Nicole when her son-in-law tried to divorce Nicole with an annulment by accusing the vicar who performed their marriage ceremony, Melchior de La Vallee, for witchcraft.

Issue
Henry and Margherita had four daughters, two of whom survived infancy:

 Stillborn daughter (February 1607);
 Nicole of Lorraine (3 October 1608 – 23 February 1657), married her cousin, Charles IV, Duke of Lorraine, separated in 1635;
 A daughter (10 February 1611 – 11 February 1611);
 Claude of Lorraine (15 October 1612 – 2 August 1648), married her cousin, Nicholas II, Duke of Lorraine

Both of Margherita's two daughters married their cousins, who were Henry's successors due to the fact that he and Margherita did not have a son to inherit his estates.

Death 

Margherita died in Nancy in 1632 at the age of forty. She had been a widow since 1624.

Ancestry

References

Sources

|-

1591 births
1632 deaths
Nobility of Mantua
Margherita Gonzaga
Margherita
Margherita
16th-century Italian nobility
16th-century Italian women
17th-century Italian nobility
17th-century Italian women
17th-century French nobility
17th-century French women
Margherita
Daughters of monarchs